Alva J. McClain (1888-1968) was the founder and first president of Grace Theological Seminary and Grace College. He served in that capacity from 1937 until his retirement in 1962, when he was named president emeritus.

He served as professor of Christian theology at GTS. He previously taught at the Philadelphia School of the Bible, the Bible Institute of Los Angeles, Ashland College, and Ashland Theological Seminary. A widely known lecturer and writer, he was a charter member of the Evangelical Theological Society, served on the Scofield Reference Bible Revision Committee, and was a member of Phi Beta Kappa.

Published works
 Alva J. McClain, The Greatness of The Kingdom: An Inductive Study of the Kingdom of God (BMH Books, 1959).
 Alva J. McClain, Romans: The Gospel of God's Grace (BMH Books, 1973).

References
Norman B. Rohrer, A Saint in Glory Stands: The Story of Alva J. McClain, Founder of Grace Theological Seminary (BMH Books, 1986)

1888 births
1968 deaths
Seminary presidents
Place of birth missing
American evangelicals